Aliabad-e Golbanu (also Romanized as ‘Alīābād-e Golbānū; also known as ‘Alīābād) is a village in Haft Ashiyan Rural District, Kuzaran District, Kermanshah County, Kermanshah Province, Iran. At the 2006 census, its population was 40, in 9 families.

References 

Populated places in Kermanshah County